Belaya Gorka 1-ya is a rural locality (a selo) in Sukhodonetskoye Rural Settlement, Bogucharsky District, Voronezh Oblast, Russia. The population was 169 as of 2010. There are 5 streets.

Geography 
Belaya Gorka 1-ya is located 46 km southeast of Boguchar (the district's administrative centre) by road. Sukhoy Donets is the nearest rural locality.

References 

Rural localities in Bogucharsky District